Bogdan Macovei (born 28 January 1983 in Vatra Dornei, Romania) is a Romanian-born Moldovan luger who has competed since 2003. Competing in two Winter Olympics, he earned his best finish of 30th in the men's singles event at Turin in 2006.

Macovei also finished 44th in the men's singles event at the 2007 FIL World Luge Championships in Igls.

References
 
 FIL-Luge profile

External links 
 
 
 

1983 births
Living people
Moldovan male lugers
Olympic lugers of Moldova
Lugers at the 2006 Winter Olympics
Lugers at the 2010 Winter Olympics
Lugers at the 2014 Winter Olympics
People from Vatra Dornei